Chapayevets is a rural locality (a khutor) in Sukhodolskoye Rural Settlement, Sredneakhtubinsky District, Volgograd Oblast, Russia. The population was 205 as of 2010. There are 4 streets.

Geography 
Chapayevets is located 17 km south of Srednyaya Akhtuba (the district's administrative centre) by road. Malyayevskiye Dachi is the nearest rural locality.

References 

Rural localities in Sredneakhtubinsky District